Argusto is a comune and town in the province of Catanzaro in the Calabria region of southern Italy.

References

Cities and towns in Calabria